Bob Neff (born March 5, 1944) is a former American football defensive back. He played for the Miami Dolphins from 1966 to 1968.

References

1944 births
Living people
American football defensive backs
Stephen F. Austin Lumberjacks football players
Miami Dolphins players